Swindon TMD is a traction maintenance depot located in Swindon, Wiltshire, England. The depot is situated on the Great Western Main Line and is near Swindon station.

The depot code is SW.

History 
Between 1957 and 1993, Class 03, 05, 08 shunters, Class 22, Class 52, Class 37 and 47 locomotives could be seen at the depot.

References 

Rail transport in Wiltshire
 Railway depots in England